Mildenberger is a German surname. Notable people with the surname include:

John Joseph Mildenberger (1895–1976), Russian-born farmer, civil servant, educator, and political figure in Canada
Karl Mildenberger (born 1937), German boxer

German-language surnames
Surnames of German origin